{{Infobox planet
| name = Metis
| image = Metis.jpg
| caption = Image taken by Galileos Solid State Imager between November 1996 and June 1997
| pronounced =  
| adjective = Metidian, Metidean 
| named_after = Μήτις Mētis
| discoverer = S. Synnott
| discovered = 4 March 1979
| mean_orbit_radius =  (1.792 RJ)
| eccentricity = 
| period =  
| periapsis = 
| apoapsis = 
| avg_speed = 31.501 km/s
| inclination = 0.06° (to Jupiter's equator)
| satellite_of = Jupiter
| mean_radius = 
| dimensions = 60 × 40 × 34 km
| volume = 
| surface_area = 
| mass = 
| density = 
| surface_grav = 
| escape_velocity = 
| rotation = synchronous
| axial_tilt = zero
| albedo = 
| single_temperature = ≈ 123 K
It was discovered in 1979 in images taken by Voyager 1, and was named in 1983 after the first wife of Zeus, Metis. Additional observations made between early 1996 and September 2003 by the Galileo spacecraft allowed its surface to be imaged.

Metis is tidally locked to Jupiter, and its shape is strongly asymmetrical, with one of the diameters being almost twice as large as the smallest one. It is also one of the two moons known to orbit Jupiter in less than the length of Jupiter's day, the other being Adrastea. It orbits within the main ring of Jupiter, and is thought to be a major contributor of material to the rings.

 Discovery and observations 

Metis was discovered in 1979 by Stephen P. Synnott in images taken by the Voyager 1 probe and was provisionally designated as '''. In 1983, it was officially named after the mythological Metis, a Titaness who was the first wife of Zeus (the Greek equivalent of Jupiter). The photographs taken by Voyager 1 showed Metis only as a dot, and hence knowledge about Metis was very limited until the arrival of the Galileo spacecraft. Galileo imaged almost all of the surface of Metis and put constraints on its composition by 1998.

Although the Juno'' orbiter, which arrived at Jupiter in 2016, has a camera called JunoCam, it is almost entirely focused on observations of Jupiter itself. During close observations of Jupiter, it may capture some distant images of the innermost moons Metis and Adrastea.

Physical characteristics 

Metis has an irregular shape and measures 60 × 40 × 34 km across, which makes it the second smallest of the four inner satellites of Jupiter. Therefore, a very rough estimate of its surface area could be placed between 5,800 and 11,600 square kilometers (approx. 8,700). The bulk composition and mass of Metis are not known, but assuming that its mean density is like that of Amalthea (~0.86 g/cm3), its mass can be estimated as ~3.6×1016 kg. This density would imply that it is composed of water ice with a porosity of 10–15%.

The surface of Metis is heavily cratered, dark, and appears to be reddish in color. There is a substantial asymmetry between leading and trailing hemispheres: the leading hemisphere is 1.3 times brighter than the trailing one. The asymmetry is probably caused by the higher velocity and frequency of impacts on the leading hemisphere, which excavate a bright material (presumably ice) from its interior.

Orbit and rotation 
Metis is the innermost of Jupiter's four small inner moons. It orbits Jupiter at a distance of ~128,000 km (1.79 Jupiter radii) within Jupiter's main ring. Metis's orbit has very small eccentricity (~0.0002) and inclination (~ 0.06°) relative to the equator of Jupiter.

Due to tidal locking, Metis rotates synchronously with its orbital period (about 7 hours), with its longest axis aligned towards Jupiter.

Metis lies inside Jupiter's synchronous orbit radius (as does Adrastea), and as a result, tidal forces slowly cause its orbit to decay. If its density is similar to Amalthea's, Metis's orbit lies within the fluid Roche limit; however, because it has not broken up, it must lie outside its rigid Roche limit.

Metis is the fastest-moving of Jupiter's moons. It orbits Jupiter at 31.5 km/s.

Jupiter casts a shadow on all of Metis for 68 minutes each Metian day.

Relationship with Jupiter's rings 

Metis's orbit lies ~1,000 km within the main ring of Jupiter. It orbits within a ~500 km wide "gap" or "notch" in the ring. The gap is clearly somehow related to the moon but the origin of this connection has not been established. Metis supplies a significant part of the main ring's dust. This material appears to consist primarily of material that is ejected from the surfaces of Jupiter's four small inner satellites by meteorite impacts. It is easy for the impact ejecta to be lost from the satellites into space because the satellites' surfaces lie fairly close to the edge of their Roche spheres due to their low density.

See also 
Timeline of discovery of Solar System planets and their moons
 Inner satellite
 Rings of Jupiter

Notes

References

Cited sources

 
 
 
 
  (discovery)
  (naming the moon)

External links 

 Metis Profile by NASA's Solar System Exploration

Moons of Jupiter
19790304
Discoveries by Stephen P. Synnott
Moons with a prograde orbit